Clive Lewis may refer to:

 C. S. Lewis (Clive Staples Lewis, 1898–1963), British writer
 Clive 'Crash' Lewis, musician in Goteki and Sneaky Bat Machine
 Clive Derby-Lewis (1936–2016), South African politician
 Clive Lewis (judge) (born 1960), judge of the High Court of England and Wales
 Clive Lewis (footballer) in FA Youth Cup Finals of the 1950s
 Clive Lewis (politician) (born 1971), British Member of Parliament
 Clive Lewis (business psychologist) (born 1969)

See also
 Lewis Clive (1910–1938), British rower